In geometry, a tessellation of dimension  (a plane tiling) or higher, or a polytope of dimension  (a polyhedron) or higher, is isohedral or face-transitive if all its faces are the same. More specifically, all faces must be not merely congruent but must be transitive, i.e. must lie within the same symmetry orbit. For this reason, convex isohedral polyhedra are the shapes that will make fair dice.

Isohedral polyhedra are called isohedra. They can be described by their face configuration. An isohedron has an even number of faces.

The dual of an isohedral polyhedron is vertex-transitive, i.e. isogonal. The Catalan solids, the bipyramids, and the trapezohedra are all isohedral. They are the duals of the (isogonal) Archimedean solids, prisms, and antiprisms, respectively. The Platonic solids, which are either self-dual or dual with another Platonic solid, are vertex-, edge-, and face-transitive (i.e. isogonal, isotoxal, and isohedral).

A form that is isohedral, has regular vertices, and is also edge-transitive (i.e. isotoxal) is said to be a quasiregular dual. Some theorists regard these figures as truly quasiregular because they share the same symmetries, but this is not generally accepted.

A polyhedron which is isohedral and isogonal is said to be noble.

Not all isozonohedra are isohedral. For example, a rhombic icosahedron is an isozonohedron but not an isohedron.

Examples

Classes of isohedra by symmetry

k-isohedral figure
A polyhedron (or polytope in general) is k-isohedral if it contains k faces within its symmetry fundamental domains. Similarly, a k-isohedral tiling has k separate symmetry orbits (it may contain m different face shapes, for m = k, or only for some m < k). ("1-isohedral" is the same as "isohedral".)

A monohedral polyhedron or monohedral tiling (m = 1) has congruent faces, either directly or reflectively, which occur in one or more symmetry positions. An m-hedral polyhedron or tiling has m different face shapes ("dihedral", "trihedral"... are the same as "2-hedral", "3-hedral"... respectively).

Here are some examples of k-isohedral polyhedra and tilings, with their faces colored by their k symmetry positions:

Related terms
A cell-transitive or isochoric figure is an n-polytope (n ≥ 4) or n-honeycomb (n ≥ 3) that has its cells congruent and transitive with each others. In 3 dimensions, the catoptric honeycombs, duals to the uniform honeycombs, are isochoric. In 4 dimensions, isochoric polytopes have been enumerated up to 20 cells.

A facet-transitive or isotopic figure is an n-dimensional polytope or honeycomb with its facets ((n−1)-faces) congruent and transitive. The dual of an isotope is an isogonal polytope. By definition, this isotopic property is common to the duals of the uniform polytopes.
An isotopic 2-dimensional figure is isotoxal, i.e. edge-transitive.
An isotopic 3-dimensional figure is isohedral, i.e. face-transitive.
An isotopic 4-dimensional figure is isochoric, i.e. cell-transitive.

See also
 Edge-transitive
 Anisohedral tiling

References

External links
 
 
 
 isohedra 25 classes of isohedra with a finite number of sides
 Dice Design at The Dice Lab

Polyhedra
4-polytopes